Major Shaw (July 12, 1840 in Kent, New York – May 20, 1874) was a member of the Wisconsin State Assembly during the 1872 session. Previously, he had been elected as a town supervisor of Sherman, Sheboygan County, Wisconsin in 1869. He was a Republican. Shaw was born on July 12, 1840, in Kent, New York.

References

1840 births
1874 deaths
Republican Party members of the Wisconsin State Assembly
People from Kent, New York
People from Sheboygan County, Wisconsin
Wisconsin city council members
19th-century American politicians